Maqsudlu may refer to:
Maqsudlu, Azerbaijan
Maqsudlu, Iran
Maqsudlu-ye Olya, Iran
Maqsudlu-ye Sofla, Iran
Maqsudlu-ye Vosta, Iran